Dean is an English masculine given name and middle name with several origins:
 Derived from the Greek word "δεκανός" ("dekanos"), which means "monk or dignitary in charge of ten others"; see also Dean (Christianity)
 Derived from the English surname Dean, from an Anglo-Saxon word meaning "valley"
 An Anglicization of the Hebrew noun דין, meaning "law", "justice" or "verdict".
Notable people and characters with the name include:

People
 Dean Acheson (1893–1971), American statesman and lawyer
 Dean Baker (born 1958), American macroeconomist
 Dean Brown (disambiguation), several people
 Dean John Browne, Canadian diplomat 
 Dean Blunt, British Artist and musician
 Dean Burmester (born 1989), Zimbabwean-born South African golfer
 Dean Cain (born 1966), American actor
 Dean Caliguire (born 1967), American football player
 Dean Callaway, Australian rugby league footballer
 Dean Cameron (born 1962), American actor, musician, and comedian
 Deen Castronovo (born 1964), American rock drummer
 Dean Chance, American baseball player
 Dean Cokinos, American football coach
 Dean Corll (1939–1973), American serial killer and rapist
 Dean Delannoit, Belgian pop singer
 Dean Edwards (born 1970), American stand-up comedian and actor
 Dean Edwards (footballer) (born 1962), English footballer and manager
 Dean Fertita, American rock musician
 Dean Fisher (born 1956), American politician
 Dean Fujioka, Japanese actor, musician, and model
 Dean Fuleihan, American civil servant
 Dean Furman (born 1988), South African footballer 
 Dean Geyer, Australian singer/actor
 Dean Griffiths, Jamaican hurdler
 Dean Hart (1954–1990), Canadian wrestler
 Dean Heller, American politician
 Dean Henderson (born 1997), English footballer
 Dean Ing (1931–2020), American author and university professor
 Dean Kamen (born 1951), American engineer, inventor, and businessman, inventor of the Segway, founder of FIRST
 Dean T. Kashiwagi, American academic in the field of procurement  
 Dean Koontz, American author
 Dean Kremer (born 1996), Israeli-American baseball player
 Dean Lewis (born 1989), Australian singer-songwriter
 Dean Lukin, Australian weightlifter
Dean Macpherson (born 1985), South African politician
 Dean Martin (disambiguation), several people
 Dean McAdams (1917–1996), American football player
 Dean McDermott, Canadian actor
 Dean Northover (born 1991), Canadian football player
 Dean O'Gorman, New Zealand actor
 Dean Obeidallah, American comedian
 Dean Palmer, American baseball player
 Dean Pelman, American-Israeli baseball player
 Dean Philpott (born 1935), American football player
 Dean Potter (1972–2015), American climber 
 Dean Reed (1938–1986), American singer in East Germany
 Dean Rusk (1909–1994), U.S. Secretary of State
 Dean Saunders (disambiguation), several people
 Dean Schneider, Swiss animal sanctuary founder and social media personality
 Dean Schofield (born 1979), English rugby player
 Dean Smith (disambiguation), several people
 Dean Spanos (born 1950), American football executive
 Dean Stoecker (born 1956/1957), American billionaire, co-founder of Alteryx
 Dean Thompson (disambiguation), several people
 Dean Torrence (born 1940), American musician, half of rock n' roll duo Jan and Dean
 Dean Wade (born 1996), American basketball player
 Dean Wareham, New Zealand-American musician
 Dean Ween, American guitarist (Ween)
 Dean Wendt, American actor
 Dean Whare (born 1990), New Zealand rugby player
 Dean Winters (born 1964), American actor
 Dean Zelinsky, American guitar luthier

People with Dean as a middle name
 Richard Dean Anderson, American actor
 James Dean Bradfield, lead singer of the Manic Street Preachers
 Alan Dean Foster, American science fiction writer
 William Dean Howells, American writer
 Jeffrey Dean Morgan, American actor
 Greg Dean Schmitz, American film journalist
 Harry Dean Stanton, American actor

People with Dean as a stage name
 Dean, stage name of South Korean R&B singer-songwriter, rapper and record producer Kwon Hyuk ( Korean : 권혁)
 Dean Ambrose (born 1985), ring name of American professional wrestler Jonathan Good
 Dean Malenko (born 1960), ring name of American wrestler Dean Simon

Fictional characters
 Dean Moriarty, character in Jack Kerouac's On the Road
 Dean Winchester, character on the show Supernatural
 Dean Walton, a fictional character in Degrassi: The Next Generation
 Dean Venture, character on the show The Venture Bros.
 Dean Thomas, a fictional character in the Harry Potter series
 Dean Forester, character on the show Gilmore Girls
 Dean Domino, a character in the 2010 game Fallout: New Vegas: Dead Money

See also
 Dean (surname)

Given names originating from a surname
Given names of Greek language origin
Given names of Hebrew language origin
English masculine given names